Sungkai is a state constituency in Perak, Malaysia, that has been represented in the Perak State Legislative Assembly. The constituency is mandated to return a single member to the Perak State Legislative Assembly under the first past the post voting system.

Demographics

History

Polling districts
According to the federal gazette issued on 31 October 2022, the Tanjong Malim constituency is divided into 49 polling districts.

Representation history

Election Results

References

Perak state constituencies